Special Forces Command may refer to a number of military units, including:

 Special Forces Command (Croatia)
 Special Forces Command (Germany)
 Special Forces Command (Sweden)
 Special Forces Command (Switzerland)
 Special Forces Command (Turkey)

See also 
 Special Operations Command (disambiguation)
 Special Warfare Command (disambiguation)
 Special Forces Group (disambiguation)